High Life is a 2009 Canadian film based on the stage play by Lee MacDougall, written by Lee MacDougall and directed by Gary Yates. Starring Timothy Olyphant, Stephen Eric McIntyre, Joe Anderson and Rossif Sutherland, High Life is a comedic heist movie from the flip-side of the '80s consumer dream.

Plot
In 1983, a visit from his former sociopathic cellmate Bug (Stephen Eric McIntyre) has led to Dick (Timothy Olyphant) being fired from his job as a hospital janitor. Unemployed and in need of fast cash Dick gets the idea to rob one of the brand new ATMs, to "buy a little self-respect," as Dick announces to Bug and the team. Enter the charismatic, criminally-minded Donnie (Joe Anderson), and the front-man, the sexy, sleepy-eyed charmer Billy (Rossif Sutherland), and all of the pieces are in place. "It's a precision job," says Dick the night before the heist: "No violence."

Things do not go according to plan and the unfolding catalogue of disasters that confronts Dick is enough to test any friend's loyalties as they bungle their way toward a pipe-dream of quick riches.

Cast
 Timothy Olyphant as Dick
 Stephen Eric McIntyre as Bug
 Joe Anderson as Donnie
 Rossif Sutherland as Billy
 Mark McKinney as Jeremy 
 Doreen Brownstone as Cheesecake Woman

Awards
Calgary International Film Festival – Best Canadian Feature

References

External links

Union Pictures – distributor

2009 films
English-language Canadian films
Films set in Canada
Films shot in Winnipeg
Films directed by Gary Yates
Canadian crime comedy films
Films based on Canadian plays
2000s English-language films
2000s Canadian films